Hokej Klub Virginitas (Hockey Club Virginity) is a semi-official compilation album by the Serbian new wave/post-punk bands La Strada and Luna, released in 1988 by Ding Dong Records. The compilation, available on compact cassette only, features recordings made by La Strada at the Peđa Vranešević studio in Novi Sad, consisting of the tracks "On" ("Himself") and "Sat" ("Clock"), Luna recordings "Spori Metropolis", recorded at the Ben Akiba theatre June 27, 1983, an entire March 11 performance at the KCM Sonja Marinković, and the band's early demo recordings made at the Radio Novi Sad and Meta Sound Studio during 1982 and 1983.

Track listing

Notes 
 Tracks 1 and 2 recorded 1980 at Peđa Vranešević's studio.
 Tracks 3, 4 and 6 recorded at Studio Radio Novi Sad and Meta Sound Studio 1982-83.
 Track 5 recorded live at the Ben Akiba Theatre concert held on 27.VI '83.
 Tracks 7 to 12 recorded live in KCM Sonja Marinković 11.III '83.

Personnel 
La Strada
 Dragan Nastasić — guitar
 Siniša llić — guitar
 Boris Oslovčan — bass
 Ivan Fece "Firchie" — drum programming
 Slobodan Tišma — vocals

 Luna
 Slobodan Tišma — vocals
 Zoran Bulatović "Bale" — guitar, backing vocals
 Ivan Fece "Firchie" — drums
 Jasmina Mitrušić — synthesizer, backing vocals

References 

Luna (1980s Serbian band) albums
La Strada (band) albums
1988 compilation albums